The Central Mint is a subsidiary company of the Central Bank of the Republic of China (Taiwan). The major activities of the mint are minting and melting circulation and commemorative coins, and producing commemorative medals and other kind of casting products for government institutions and businesses in Taiwan.

History
The mint was originally established as Shanghai Mint in Shanghai in 1920.

In 1928, Northern Expedition forces led by the Kuomintang took over Shanghai, and the Shanghai Mint was renamed Central Mint and became the subordinate of Ministry of Finance. Australian-Chinese merchant George Kwok Bew was appointed head of the Central Mint. Kwok was an associate of Sun Yat-sen and also managing director of Wing On. Five years later in 1933, the company started its operation in minting. During the Second Sino-Japanese War, the company had to be relocated inland of Mainland China in which facilities were set up in Chengtu, Kweilin, Kunming, Lanchow and Wuchang. In 1946 after the National Revolutionary Army won the war against the Japanese, the company relocated back to Shanghai.

In 1949, in the later stages of the Chinese Civil War, Shanghai was taken over by Communist forces. Part of the Central Mint was evacuated to Taiwan, while the remaining equipment and personnel were received by the Communist military administration in May 1949 and reorganised as "the People's Mint", now the Shanghai Mint, a subsidiary of China Banknote Printing and Minting.

The Central Mint officially relocated to Taiwan in May 1949 and facilities were set up in Taipei. It then became the subordinate of the Central Bank of the Republic of China (Taiwan). In 1976, the facility was relocated to Guishan Township in Taoyuan County until today.

Organizational structures
 Planning Division
 Procurement and Supply Division
 Quality Control Division
 Secretariat
 Accounting Office
 Personnel Office
 Labor Safety and Health Office
 Ethics Office
 Information Management Office
 Melting and Rolling Office
 Coining and Packing Works
 Fine Casting Works
 Maintenance Works

See also
 Central Bank of the Republic of China (Taiwan)
 Central Engraving and Printing Plant
 List of mints

References

1920 establishments in China
1949 establishments in Taiwan
Mints (currency)
Executive Yuan
Government-owned companies of Taiwan
Buildings and structures in Taoyuan City